The AO-38 is a 5.45×39mm assault rifle and AK derivative designed by Peter Andreevich Tkachev and first to use the Balanced Automatic Recoil System (BARS) to improve stability giving better accuracy over AK-74's. Its derivatives are the AK-107 and AEK-971.

References
 AO-38
  Д. Ширяев. Кто изобрел автомат Калашникова // "Солдат удачи" № 9 (72), 2000

See also
 AL-7
 AN-94
 List of assault rifles

5.45×39mm assault rifles
Kalashnikov derivatives
Assault rifles of the Soviet Union
Trial and research firearms of the Soviet Union
TsNIITochMash products